The State Research Bureau may refer to:
 State Research Bureau (organisation), the Ugandan secret police under Idi Amin
 State Research Bureau (film), a 2011 Ugandan action film